Elachista totalbella is a moth of the family Elachistidae that is found in Algeria and Tunisia.

The forewings are white except the basal part of the costa which is narrowly dark grey. The hindwings are dark grey with a white fringe.

References

totalbella
Moths described in 1908
Moths of Africa